Jacob W. Nagode (July 11, 1915 – January 31, 1976) was an American professional basketball player who played two years in the National Basketball League (NBL) for the Akron Goodyear Wingfoots during the 1939–40 and 1940–41 seasons.

References

External links
Career statistics and player information from Basketball-Reference.com

1915 births
1976 deaths
Akron Goodyear Wingfoots players
American men's basketball players
United States Army personnel of World War II
Basketball players from Illinois
Forwards (basketball)
Guards (basketball)
Northwestern Wildcats men's basketball players